Keepie uppie, keep-ups or kick-ups is the skill of juggling with an association football using feet, lower legs, knees, chest, shoulders, and head, without allowing the ball to hit the ground. It is similar to Kemari, a game formerly practiced in the Japanese imperial court. Beestera Soccer Coach, Drew Trolio, has the World Record for the fastest 100 keepy-uppies, with 100 touches in 26.8 seconds.

World records

The record for the longest duration keepie-uppie is 26 hours using just feet, legs, shoulders and head; Dan Magness completed the feat, which took place in Hong Kong, in June 2010.  The previous men's record was held by Martinho Eduardo Orige of Brazil who kept a regulation football in the air for 19 hours and 30 minutes using only the head, feet and legs. The feat was accomplished on August 2 and 3, 2003.

The fastest completed marathon while ball-juggling was by Abraham Muñoz in the México City Marathon, August, 2016.

Dan Magness, holder of the longest keepie-uppie, is also the holder of the longest distance gone while doing keepie-uppie. He managed to go  without letting the ball touch the ground. He achieved this feat on January 26, 2010 in London and in the process visited all the stadiums of the five Premier League teams in London. He started his journey at Fulham F.C.'s Craven Cottage and ended it at Tottenham Hotspur F.C.'s White Hart Lane.

Thomas Ruiz holds the world record for the longest distance covered in one hour while juggling a soccer ball. He achieved this distance on August 30, 2020, in Saline, Michigan, United States, when he traveled  while keeping the ball off the ground.

In 2020, Imogen Papworth-Heidel set herself the goal of achieving 7.1 million touches, one for every essential worker in the UK and performed 1,123,586 over a period of 195 days to raise money for charities. The remaining 5,976,414 touches were "donated" by roughly 2000 people sending in videos, including professional football players from Manchester United F.C.

The most touches of a football in 60 seconds, while keeping the ball in the air, is 274 by Isaac Wood of Australia, set on 25 October 2017 in Melbourne, Australia.

In football games

One of the more famous displays of keepie-uppie was in the 1967 Scotland–England football match, where Scottish midfielder Jim Baxter juggled the ball for some time in front of the English defence, taunting them by keeping possession. This allowed Scotland to keep possession and use up the remaining few minutes, leading to a 3–2 victory for Scotland over the world champions. "That's a defining moment for almost every football fan in Scotland irrespective of where their club allegiance lies," said football historian Bob Crampsey.

See also 
 Ferdie Adoboe
 Hacky Sack

References

Further reading 
  — McNeil encourages practicing keepie-uppies as routine exercise in order to remain fit past the age of 30.

External links

PannaFootballTube.com including freestyle soccer tutorials
Keepie uppie basics
Various Ball Control World Records
Soccer Tricks, juggling

Juggling
Association football variants
Street football games
Association football terminology
Association football skills

fi:Jalkapallon pomputtelu